Hilary Jane Calvert (born 5 October 1954) is a lawyer and a former member of the New Zealand parliament for the ACT Party. Following the resignation of ACT MP David Garrett in September 2010, she assumed a position in the House of Representatives as the next MP on ACT's list. In 2013 she was elected to the Dunedin City Council, after a failed campaign for mayor.

Early years
Before entering Parliament, Calvert was a Dunedin-based lawyer who specialising in property law. She is a former member of the Otago Central Rail Trail Charitable Trust.

Calvert is married to Alistair Broad and has three adult daughters. Both Calvert and Broad are trained lawyers, but have given up their practising certificates. Calvert now manages her property portfolio.

Political career

In the 2008 general election she was placed number six on the ACT party list and stood in the Dunedin North electorate where she got 1.8% of the votes.

David Garrett resigned as an ACT list MP over a passport controversy on 17 September 2010. Garrett then resigned from Parliament on 23 September 2010 and Calvert was declared elected to the House of Representatives the next day. While an MP, she served on several committees and was the ACT Party Whip.

Calvert did not appear on the party list released for the 2011 general election.

She challenged incumbent Dave Cull for the Dunedin mayoralty in the 2013 local body elections and also sought a seat on the Dunedin City Council. She contested these elections as an independent, unsure whether or not she was still a member of ACT. While Calvert had no previous local government experience, she finished second to Cull in the mayoral election and was elected to Council with the highest number of first-preference votes. In the 2019 local elections, she won a seat on the Otago Regional Council.

Personal policies
Calvert does not agree with attempts to ban farming chickens in cages, saying "We care about people ahead of silly little chickens."

Notes

References

Living people
Place of birth missing (living people)
ACT New Zealand MPs
Women members of the New Zealand House of Representatives
New Zealand list MPs
Dunedin City Councillors
Otago regional councillors
Unsuccessful candidates in the 1999 New Zealand general election
Unsuccessful candidates in the 2008 New Zealand general election
1954 births
Members of the New Zealand House of Representatives
21st-century New Zealand politicians
21st-century New Zealand women politicians